Jemima Montag (born 15 February 1998) is an Australian racewalker. She came sixth in the final of the Women's 20 km walk in the Tokyo 2020 Olympics in a time of 1:30.39.

Montag studies science at the University of Melbourne and works at a company that delivers food to underprivileged families,

Montag is coached by former racewalker Brent Vallance.

Early years 
Montag was born in East Melbourne, Victoria, and is Jewish. She began taking part in Little Athletics when she was seven, encouraged by her mother, who was herself a hurdler. She was inspired by Cathy Freeman, as well as her contemporaries Regan Lamble and Steven Solomon. A Jewish Australian, at age 15 was recognised for her wins at the state and national championships with the Australian 2013 Outstanding Jewish Junior Sportswoman of the Year Award. She made her first impact with a win in the under-20 section at the 2014 Oceania Race Walking Championships. A global medal came later that May, as she placed twelfth in the 10 kilometres walk at the 2014 IAAF World Race Walking Cup and shared in the team bronze with Clara Smith and Elizabeth Hosking. She graduated high school from Wesley College in 2016.

Achievements 
Montag earned selection for Australia at the 2018 Commonwealth Games through a silver medal performance behind Beki Smith at the 2018 Australia and Oceania Race Walking Championships, setting a personal best of 1:31:26 hours in her second ever competitive outing over the 20 km distance.

Montag was the gold medalist of the 20 kilometers race walk at the 2018 Commonwealth Games. She had been leading alongside fellow Australian Claire Tallent, but was assured of the win when Tallent was disqualified in the final stage of the race.

International competitions

See also
List of Commonwealth Games medallists in athletics (women)

References

External links
 
 Jemima Montag at Athletics Australia
 

1998 births
Living people
Athletes from Melbourne
Australian female racewalkers
Commonwealth Games gold medallists for Australia
Commonwealth Games medallists in athletics
Athletes (track and field) at the 2018 Commonwealth Games
Jewish female athletes (track and field)
Commonwealth Games gold medallists in athletics
Competitors at the 2019 Summer Universiade
Athletes (track and field) at the 2020 Summer Olympics
Olympic athletes of Australia
Universiade medalists in athletics (track and field)
Universiade gold medalists for Australia
Universiade silver medalists for Australia
People from East Melbourne
Medallists at the 2018 Commonwealth Games